Mount Bergne is a summit in Banff National Park, Alberta, Canada.

The mountain was named in memory of Frank Bergne, a mountain climber who had died in a climbing accident in 1907.

See also 
 List of mountains in the Canadian Rockies

References

Mountains of Banff National Park
Three-thousanders of Alberta
Alberta's Rockies